The Utes went 8–4 in the 2001 season, starting 7–2 before losing the last two conference games. They finished the season with a victory over a Carson Palmer-led USC Trojans team in the 2001 Las Vegas Bowl.

Schedule

Roster

After the season

NFL draft
Two players went in the 2002 NFL Draft, and one player was signed as an undrafted free agent.

References

Utah
Utah Utes football seasons
Las Vegas Bowl champion seasons
Utah Utes football